Roland Gift is the début solo album by English singer Roland Gift, an album which includes songs co-written with the Kane Gang's Martin Brammer and Mike Barson's brother Ben. The cover photography was by Chris Floyd.

Only one single was released from the album; "It's Only Money".  The album failed to chart in the UK Albums Chart.

"Say It Ain't So" was used in the soundtrack for the film Stealing Beauty.

Track listing
"Tell Me You Want Me Back" (Roland Gift) - 3:15
"Looking for a Friend" (Roland Gift, Evan Rogers, Carl Sturken) - 4:28
"It's Only Money" (Roland Gift, Evan Rogers, Carl Sturken) - 3:54
"Wish You Were Here" (Roland Gift, Ben Barson) - 3:49
"A Girl Like You" (Roland Gift, Ian Richardson) - 3:46
"Fairytale" (Roland Gift, Evan Rogers, Carl Sturken) - 4:49
"Superhero" (Roland Gift, Evan Rogers, Carl Sturken) - 4:45
"Lady DJ" (Roland Gift, Ben Barson) - 3:35
"Say It Ain't So" (Roland Gift) - 4:03
"Flown" (Ben Barson, Martin Brammer, Roland Gift) - 4:29
"If We Ain't Got Love" (Roland Gift, Ben Barson) - 4:14
"What Do You Mean"(Roland Gift, Ben Barson) - 3:22

References

2002 debut albums
MCA Records albums